Tingping Township is a rural township in Chengbu Miao Autonomous County, Hunan, China. The town shares a border with Wutuan Town to the west, Baimaoping Township to the east, Rulin Town to the north, and Jiangdi Township of Longsheng Various Nationalities Autonomous County to the south.

Name
There is a river name "Jiebei River" crossing the township. The headwaters meet with the river in the shape of Chinese character "". In Chinese, the pronunciation of the characters "" and "" are similar. "" means a flat piece of land. Therefore, it is named "Tingping".

History
In 1995, the townships of Pengdong and Yangmei'ao merged into Tingping Township.

Administrative division
As of 2015, the township is divided into 16 villages: Tingping, Guihua, Hengshui, Changtan, Dahou, Pengying, Aishang, Tuanxinzhai, Dashui, Gutian, Yangmei, Gaoqiao, Anle, Longtang, Taiyang and Jintongshan.

Geography
The township is located in the south of Chengbu Miao Autonomous County.

There are two main rivers in the township: Changtan River and Great River.

Demographics
In December 2015, the township had an estimated population of 17,200 and a population density of 66 persons per km2. Miao people is the dominant ethnic group in the township, accounting for 11,000, accounting for 63.95%. There are also 11 ethnic groups, such as Dong, Hui, Zhuang, and Manchu. Among them, there are 3,100 Han people (18.02%) and 2,900 Dong, Manchu, Hui and Zhuang people (16.86%).

Economy
The town's economy is based on nearby mineral resources and agricultural resources. Dairy farming is the main source of income The region abounds with tungsten, lead, copper, gold, silicon, crystal, etc.

Transport
The Provincial Highway S219 passes across the town north to south.

References

Chengbu Miao Autonomous County